Phryneta elobeyana is a species of beetle in the family Cerambycidae. It was described by Báguena in 1952. It is known from Equatorial Guinea.

References

Phrynetini
Beetles described in 1952